Celtic Park was a multi-use stadium in Belfast, Northern Ireland. It was used for football matches and was the home of Belfast Celtic F.C. Throughout the majority of its existence it was a greyhound racing track. The stadium was able to hold 50,000 spectators at its height, with 5,000 of those spectators seated.

Football
The stadium ceased to host Belfast Celtic matches when the team stopped playing competitive matches in 1949. Like Celtic Park in Glasgow, Scotland, it was known as "Paradise" by its fans. The football team ran into financial issues and finally dissolved in 1960 but the stadium was then firmly established as a greyhound stadium.

Greyhound Racing

Origins
Two Belfast bookmakers called Joe Shaw and Hugh McAlinden visited to Belle Vue Stadium in 1926 to view the new form of greyhound racing around an oval. They duly formed the National Racing Greyhound Company with the assistance of Paddy O’Donoghue and James Clarke. It was the first greyhound track to open in Ireland on Easter Monday 18 April 1927, and one of the first in the United Kingdom. The company would take control of Ireland's second track Shelbourne Park in 1927.

McAlinden was the chairman of Belfast Celtic and he instigated the lease of the stadium for the racing which would be governed by the Irish Coursing Club, the official regulatory body of greyhound racing in Ireland. On opening night racing consisted of two hurdles races in the six race card and one race ended with a dead heat between Keep Whistling and Imperial Jimmy.

Early history
The first ever winner (not only at Celtic Park but in Ireland) was a greyhound called Mutual Friend (Three Speed x Lazy Peggy) on the Easter Monday; the April 1923 whelp was owned by Jim Tuite of Railway House, Oldcastle, County Meath.

Duneynie Castle claimed the Belfast Telegraph Cup competition in the summer of 1927 and re-opening for a second season in March 1928 patrons were able to purchase a complete form guide of the previous season from all Irish Coursing Club tracks for one shilling. Two months later on 11 May Mick the Miller finished third in the Abercorn Cup final at the track over 526 yards.

A major event introduced in 1926 was the Trigo Cup; William Barnett presented a cup to Celtic Park after his horse Trigo won The Derby and St Leger Stakes. The Trigo Cup would gain classic status some years later in 1944 and second major competition called the McAlevey Gold Cup was inaugurated in 1938. In 1932 and 1943 the track hosted the Irish St Leger one of Ireland's premier races and in July 1946, the first case of a greyhound traveling by air took place. Warrington greyhound Clady Border trained by Ken Newham went from Manchester airport to Belfast to take part in an event at Celtic Park in which he won.

The first Racing Manager at the Track was Jim Rice and after his passing he was honoured by the track hosting the Jim Rice Memorial Trophy. Another competition called the Ulster Sprint Cup was a regular event from 1930 and the Trigo Cup was also known as the Ulster Derby for many years.

Later history
In 1955, Spanish Battleship appeared at the track for his final race in Ireland. The track suffering from a lack of investment and hampered by the troubles in Northern Ireland began to go downhill. However, in 1978 a new board of directors took over, Sean and Brian Graham and Jim Delargy closed the track to allow for refurbishment and Eddie O'Hagan the Racing Manager retired. The changes included an all-sand track from grass. The track finally opened two years later during April 1980.

Closure
Brookmount Properties bought the site for redevelopment and the last meeting was held on 31 October 1983. The site of Celtic Park is now occupied by a shopping centre.

Competitions
Trigo Cup/Ulster Derby
McAlevey Gold Cup
Irish St Leger

Notable track records

References

External links
Stadium information
Stadium information
History of Dog Racing in Ireland

Association football venues in Northern Ireland
Athletics (track and field) venues in Northern Ireland
Defunct association football venues in Northern Ireland
Defunct greyhound racing venues in the United Kingdom
Sports venues in Belfast
Multi-purpose stadiums in the United Kingdom
Defunct sports venues in Northern Ireland
Ireland national football team (1882–1950)
Sports venues completed in 1901
Belfast Celtic F.C.
1901 establishments in Ireland
1983 disestablishments in Northern Ireland
Greyhound racing in Ireland